Baphiastrum elegans is a species of flowering plants in the legume family, Fabaceae. It is found in Africa.

References

External links 

 Baphiastrum elegans at Tropicos
 Baphiastrum elegans at The Plant List

Baphieae
Plants described in 1925
Flora of Africa